Alaa al-Din Pasha bin Abdul Hamid Pasha al-Droubi (1870 – 21 August 1920) was a Syrian politician who served as Prime Minister of Syria for a month before his assassination in 1920.

Biography 
Born in Homs (Syria), in a well-known family with rich traditions. He studied in Istanbul. Then he was one of the many doctors of Sultan Abdul-Hamid II. Together with his two brothers he studied political rights there and graduated from the Galata Institute as it was called at that time.

References 

1870 births
1920 deaths
Assassinated Syrian politicians
20th-century Syrian politicians
Prime Ministers of Syria
Arabs from the Ottoman Empire
Assassinated heads of government